Serge Ornem is a Paralympian athlete from France competing mainly in category T46 sprint events.

Serge has competed in the 2000, 2004 and 2008 Summer Paralympics always in the T46 100m, 200m and  relay.  He has been part of the silver medal-winning relay teams in both the 2000 and 2004 games.

External links
 

Paralympic athletes of France
Athletes (track and field) at the 2000 Summer Paralympics
Athletes (track and field) at the 2004 Summer Paralympics
Paralympic silver medalists for France
French male sprinters
Living people
Medalists at the 2000 Summer Paralympics
Medalists at the 2004 Summer Paralympics
Year of birth missing (living people)
Paralympic medalists in athletics (track and field)
20th-century French people
21st-century French people
Sprinters with limb difference
Paralympic sprinters